Olivier Chapuis (born 10 January 1975) is a French retired competitive ice dancer. With dance partner Véronique Delobel, he competed internationally for France, winning medals at the 2000 Ondrej Nepela Memorial and competing on the ISU Grand Prix of Figure Skating. Before teaming up with Delobel, he competed internationally with partners Magali Sauri and Anne Chaigneau.

Results 
GP: Grand Prix

With Delobel

With Sauri

With Chaigneau

References

External links
 Icedance.com profile: Delobel & Chapuis at Archive.org

French male ice dancers
1975 births
Living people
Competitors at the 2001 Winter Universiade